Suuna I Kisolo, also spelled as Ssuuna I Kisolo, was Kabaka (King) of the Kingdom of Buganda, reigning from about 1584 until his death around 1614. He was the 11th Kabaka of Buganda.

Claim to the throne
He was the son of Kabaka Nakibinge Kagali, Kabaka of Buganda between 1524 and 1554. His mother was Nassuuna, his father's fifth wife. He took the throne after the death of his elder half-brother, Kabaka Jemba, in 1584. He established his capital at Gimbo Hill.

Married life
He married two wives:

 Nakigo, daughter of Walusimbi, of the Ffumbe clan
 Naluggwa, daughter of Lwoomwa, of the Ndiga clan

Issue
He fathered four sons:

 Prince (Omulangira) Sewatti, whose mother was Nakigo
 Prince (Omulangira) Gogombe
 Prince (Omulangira) Kawaali
 Kabaka Kimbugwe Kamegere, Kabaka of Buganda, whose mother was Naluggwa.

The final years
He died in middle-age, at his capital at Gimbo, Busiro in 1614. He was buried at Gimbo.

See also
 Suna II of Buganda
 Kabaka of Buganda

Succession table

References

External links
List of the Kings of Buganda

Kabakas of Buganda
16th-century African people
17th-century African people
1614 deaths
Year of birth unknown